Virginia Mae Brown (November 13, 1923 – February 15, 1991) was an American civil servant, government official, and lawyer. Among her many "firsts", she became West Virginia's first female assistant attorney general by working for Attorney General John G. Fox. She was later named West Virginia's insurance commissioner, the first female to hold this position in the United States. President Lyndon B. Johnson appointed Brown a member of the Interstate Commerce Commission (ICC), the first female since its inception in 1887, and later promoted her to be its first female chair.

Early life 

Virginia May Brown was born in Pliny, West Virginia, on November 13, 1923. Her father was Felix M. Brown and her mother was Hester Ann Crandall. Her siblings were a sister, Anna, who was a year older and a brother, Winston, who was two years younger than her. The U.S. Census shows the Brown family living in Buffalo, West Virginia, in 1930 and 1940—just across the Kanawha River from Pliny. The 1940 U.S. Census shows Brown was in her third year of high school. She graduated from Point Pleasant High School in 1941 at age 17.

Brown immediately attended West Virginia University and earned her Bachelor of Arts degree. She acquired the nickname "Peaches" there. After graduating from West Virginia University, she taught at Winfield High School in Putnam County, West Virginia, for a year and a half, and then enrolled in the West Virginia University College of Law.

Midlife 
Brown earned her law degree graduating from West Virginia University College of Law in 1947. Her first job after college was as a law clerk to West Virginia attorney general Ira J. Partlow. In 1949, she was appointed executive secretary to the West Virginia Judicial Council. In 1952, she became an assistant to Attorney General John G. Fox, becoming West Virginia's first female assistant attorney general. William Wallace Barron reappointed Brown to the position in 1956. In the early part of 1961, Barron (who was then West Virginia's governor) appointed Brown as his legal advisor.

In May 1961, Brown was named West Virginia's insurance commissioner, becoming the first female of that public official in the United States. Barron made Brown a member of the West Virginia Public Service Commission in September 1962—the only woman in the state to hold this position. Brown was appointed a member of the Interstate Commerce Commission (ICC) in March 1964 by President Lyndon B. Johnson, the first female since its inception in 1887. She was promoted to vice chairman of the commission in 1968. In 1969, President Johnson promoted her as the first female chair of the Interstate Commerce Commission for a one-year term. Brown was referred to as the "First Lady of Transportation". She is the first woman to direct a regulatory commission in the United States.

Brown served in 1967 as a delegate on the Inland Transport Committee to the United Nations. The meeting took place in Geneva, Switzerland.

Later life and death 

After Brown left the Interstate Commerce Commission in 1979, she was president and chair of the board of the Buffalo Bank of Eleanor. From 1983 through 1991 she served in the United States Department of Health and Human Services office of hearing appeals in Charleston, West Virginia, in the position of chief administrative law judge. She died of a heart attack in Charleston on February 15, 1991.

Personal life 
Brown married James Vernon Brown, a lawyer, on April 8, 1955. They had two daughters. Their marriage ended in divorce.

Brown was a member of the Presbyterian Christian faith.

Societies 
Brown was a member of the

 Putman County Bar Association
 West Virginia State Bar
 American Bar Association
 Democratic political party

Poem 
Adlai Stevenson wrote a poem concerning Brown:
Peaches, thy beauty is to me
Like thy decisions on the ICC.

Legacy 

Brown has set several "first woman" records in high level government management positions previously held only by men:
 First woman executive secretary to the West Virginia Judicial Council (1949), a position no woman in the United States had ever served.
 First woman executive secretary to the Judicial Council of West Virginia (1944–1952).
 First woman in West Virginia to be the state's assistant attorney general (1952–1961).
 First woman insurance commissioner in the United States (1961).
 First woman to be West Virginia Public Service Commission member (1962).
 First woman chairperson of an independent federal agency, the United States Interstate Commerce Commission (1969–1970).

Footnotes

Bibliography 

 
 

1923 births
1991 deaths
20th-century American businesspeople
20th-century American lawyers
20th-century American women
20th-century Presbyterians
American bank presidents
American women chief executives
American women civil servants
Businesspeople from Charleston, West Virginia
Lawyers from Charleston, West Virginia
People from Buffalo, West Virginia
People from Putnam County, West Virginia
People of the Interstate Commerce Commission
Presbyterians from West Virginia
State insurance commissioners of the United States
United States Department of Health and Human Services officials
West Virginia Democrats
West Virginia lawyers
West Virginia University alumni
West Virginia University College of Law alumni